Matías Sborowitz (born 9 July 1993) is a Chilean former  tennis player.

As a junior, he achieved a career high ranking of 25. Sborowitz played college tennis at Pepperdine University. Sborowitz made his ATP main draw debut at the 2012 VTR Open in the doubles draw, partnering Gonzalo Lama, losing in the first round. It would be the only ATP match of his career. 

Sborowitz had a career high ATP singles ranking of 456, and a career high ATP doubles ranking of 1528, achieved on 21 September 2015. He retired in 2014.

References

External links

1993 births
Living people
Chilean male tennis players
Tennis players from Santiago
Pepperdine Waves men's tennis players